Effective elastic thickness of the lithosphere is the estimated thickness of the elastic plate to substitute for lithosphere in order to investigate observed deformation. It is also presented as Te (effective or equivalent).

Effective elastic thickness of the oceanic lithosphere
Te  is largely dependent on the thermal structure of the lithosphere, its thickness and the coupling of crust with mantle.
For the oceanic lithosphere with coupled crust and mantle,  Te  is usually taken to the base of the mechanical lithosphere (isotherm of 500 - 600 °C). This way it is also age dependent, as gradually thickens moving off the oceanic ridge.

Effective elastic thickness of the continental lithosphere   
For the continental lithosphere more aspects are taken under consideration, thermal age is only the estimate for slowly cooling cratonic areas, where mantle is involved and Te reaches large values.
Similar conditions are expected also on terrestrial planets.
If the crust is decoupled from mantle, value follows the average crustal thickness. Topography  load is also important factor, significantly lowering the value of  Te.

Methods of determination  
Methods for Te  determination on continents  are mostly based on thermal and rheological approach, but also on comparison of gravity anomalies and topography.
For thermally young areas Te is about 20-30 km, for older 40-50 km, cratons can reach more than 100 km. Determination of the effective elastic thickness is important for Earth's surface deformation studies, warp tectonics, glacial isostatic rebound and sea-level changes.

See also
 Lithospheric flexure

References

Lithosphere